Dr George Augustus Borthwick FRSE FRCSE FSA (1784-1844) was a Scottish physician and surgeon. He was Physician to the Royal Dispensary in Edinburgh and helped to establish the Edinburgh Eye Dispensary.

Life
He was born in 1784.In 1808 he received his doctorate from the University of Edinburgh.

In 1820 he was elected a Fellow of the Royal Society of Edinburgh. His proposers were Sir James Hall, 4th Baronet, Sir George Steuart Mackenzie,  and John Borthwick of Crookston (thought to be a brother or cousin). At this time he was living at 83 George Street in Edinburgh's New Town. In 1821 he was elected a member of the Aesculapian Club. In May 1831 he was commissioned as a Surgeon into the Royal Midlothian Yeoman Cavalry.

He is buried in the grave of his son-in-law, Robert Lee, Lord Lee in Dean Cemetery in western Edinburgh. The grave lies on the south wall of the first northern extension, towards the south-west.

Family

In March 1821 he married Janet Kinnear. They had at least five children, including George and Fearne Borthwick.

References

1784 births
1844 deaths
19th-century Scottish medical doctors
Alumni of the University of Edinburgh
Fellows of the Royal Society of Edinburgh
Burials at the Dean Cemetery